is a Japanese politician and a member of the House of Councillors in the Diet (national legislature).

He has been a member of the Democratic Party of Japan (DPJ), then of Your Party, then an independent. In September 2017, he applies to join the LDP.

A native of Tokyo and graduate of the Law Faculty of the University of Tokyo, he joined Industrial Bank of Japan in 1987, receiving MBA in 1992 from Stanford University while working at the bank. Leaving the bank in 1995, he was elected to the House of Councillors for the first time in 1998 to represent Kanagawa Prefecture. He was re-elected in 2004, and was appointed the Shadow Foreign Minister by the DPJ leader Seiji Maehara. He was later expelled from the DPJ after announcing he would run for a district seat in Kanagawa during the 2009 General election, joining Your Party as a founding member one month later. Taking helm of the party in April 2014 after a financial scandal touching its founder, he voted in favor of disbanding it in November 2014 over dissension against plans to support the LDP. In October 2016 however, Asao began voting with the LDP lower house fraction, and then joined the LDP in September 2017 after the announcement of anticipated elections by prime minister Abe.

References

External links 
  in Japanese.

Members of the House of Representatives (Japan)
Members of the House of Councillors (Japan)
1964 births
Living people
Stanford Graduate School of Business alumni
University of Tokyo alumni
Democratic Party of Japan politicians
Your Party politicians
21st-century Japanese politicians